New Forms is the debut studio album by British drum and bass group Roni Size & Reprazent. It was originally released on 23 June 1997 through Talkin' Loud, and later re-released by Mercury Records and Universal Music Group. The album was released to critical and commercial success, winning the 1997 Mercury Prize, certifying platinum in the UK, and often being cited as their magnum opus.

New Forms was promoted by the release of its four singles, "Share the Fall", "Heroes", "Brown Paper Bag" and "Watching Windows", all landing on the UK Singles Chart and featuring vocals from Onallee. The album features production credits from Roni Size, Krust, DJ Die and Suv.

Release
New Forms was preceded by a 1996 EP named Reasons for Sharing containing "Share the Fall", "Down", "Trust Me", and "Sounds Fresh", the former three of which were featured on the album. On 19 May 1997, the album's lead single was released, "Share the Fall", which reached number 37 in the UK Singles Chart in June that year. The album was released on 23 June 1997 and charted on the UK Albums Chart for 46 weeks, peaking at number 8. Following the album, three singles were released "Heroes", "Brown Paper Bag" and "Watching Windows", all charting at positions 31, 20 and 28 respectively, with "Brown Paper Bag" remaining the group's highest charting single.

The album was released in various formats, all with differing track lists. The original album release was a two disc CD, though single disc editions only containing disc one were later released. The cassette  version comprised the first disc of the CD. Two vinyl versions were released, a 5x and 4x LP. Of the two vinyl versions, the most common pressing is the 4LP version comprising most of the first CD; the 5x LP set includes tracks from the second CD, replacing "Intro" with "Heroes" and "Digital", which are appended to the end. In the US, only the 2CD version was released, which contained the bonus track "Electricks".

A remake of the original album, New Forms², was released in April 2008. Roni Size has described it as having a "new coat of armour added to the original tracks". The album contains four new songs: "Heart to Heart", "Less is More", "Don't Hold Back" and "Encore", while omitting several of the songs from the original album.

Critical reception

New Forms was released to favourable reviews. AllMusic described the album as "the major statement on drum'n'bass", rating it five stars out of five, while in 2010 BBC Music noted that it "carved a mainstream niche for drum and bass like no album before it". Entertainment Weekly noted the album's "caffeinated drum beat and blissful bass reverb". Pitchforks Ryan Schreiber was less generous, commenting that the album "doesn't really get decent until the second half of disc one".

Track listing
The original CD release contains both discs, though a single disc version containing only disc 1 was additionally released in the UK.

Personnel
Adapted from the liner notes.

Roni Size (Ryan Williams) – writing, production, keyboards
Onallee (Tracey Bowen) – vocals, writing
Dynamite MC (Dominic Smith) – vocals, writing
DJ Die (Daniel Kausman) – writing, production
DJ Suv (Paul Southey) – writing, production
Krust (Kirk Thompson) – writing, production
Clive Deamer – drums
Si John – bass
Bahamadia (Antonia Reed) – vocals
Tyrrell – guitar
Adrian Place – saxophone
Róisín Murphy - vocals (sampled)
Gilles Peterson – A&R
Paul Martin – A&R
Intro. London – design
Vikki Jackman – photography
Simon Goffe – management

Accolades

Charts

Year-end charts

Certifications

References

1997 debut albums
Roni Size albums
Mercury Prize-winning albums
Talkin' Loud albums